Guvlymayak (Russian:) is a settlement in the Balkan Region of Turkmenistan adjacent to the Caspian Sea. There is a lighthouse.

History 
The settlement was initiated c. 1931 by a group of Kazakhs, who fled their Republic during the contemporaneous famine.

Economy 
Local economy is dependent on salt which is mined from an adjacent lake. "Guwlyduz”, the salt-processing unit — formerly, the Kuuli-sol complex —  is the oldest chemical plant in Turkmenistan; it remains the major supplier for not only edible salt but also industrial salt. Post upgradations in 2019, Guwlyduz had an annual production capacity of 40 kilotonnes of iodised salt.

In 2018, the Government floated tender for construction of a "sturgeon farm" and a "fish processing facility."

References

External links 
 Photograph of the lighthouse in night

Populated places in Balkan Region